Jonathan de Souza Santos (born 19 May 1990) is a Paralympian athlete from Brazil competing mainly in F41 classification throwing events.

Athletics career
De Souza Santos first represented his country at a Paralympic Games in 2008 in Beijing, entering the F40 shot put event. His best throw of 10.53 saw him finish outside the medals in fifth place. Success was to follow at the 2012 Summer Paralympics in London, where he won his first Paralympic medal; a bronze in the F40 discus throw, recording a distance of 40.49 metres. As well as his Paralympic success, de Souza Santos won a silver in the discus at the 2011 IPC Athletics World Championships in Christchurch. After the London Games the International Paralympic Committee redefined the F40 classification, splitting it into two categories for athletes of short stature, and de Souza Santos was reclassified as a F41 athlete. As an F41 competitor he has achieved further success winning gold at the 2013 World Championships in Lyon, along with a silver in the shot put. He added a further shot put bronze medal two years later in Doha.

Personal history
De Souza Santos  was born in Maceió, Brazil in 1990.

References

External links
 

1990 births
Living people
Brazilian male discus throwers
Brazilian male shot putters
Paralympic athletes of Brazil
Paralympic bronze medalists for Brazil
Paralympic medalists in athletics (track and field)
Athletes (track and field) at the 2008 Summer Paralympics
Athletes (track and field) at the 2012 Summer Paralympics
Medalists at the 2012 Summer Paralympics
People from Maceió
Sportspeople from Alagoas
21st-century Brazilian people